Dandelion was a rural intentional community near Enterprise, Ontario, active in the 1970s, and disbanded around 1990. It was a member of the Federation of Egalitarian Communities, meeting all requirements for full membership.

Dandelion was the birthplace of singer/songwriter Devon Sproule.

References

Egalitarianism
Intentional communities in Canada
Egalitarian communities